NA-123 Lahore-VII is a newly-created constituency for the National Assembly of Pakistan. It mainly comprises the Walton Cantonment.

Members of Parliament

2018-2022: NA-131 Lahore-IX

Election 2018 

General elections were held on 25 July 2018. Chairman Pakistan Tehreek-e-Insaf, Imran Khan won the election but vacated this constituency and three others in favor of NA-95 (Mianwali-I).

By-election 2018

By-elections were held in this constituency on 14 October 2018.

See also
NA-122 Lahore-VI
NA-124 Lahore-VIII

References 

Lahore